Bancel is a surname. Notable people with the surname include: 

Louis Bancel (theologian) (1628–1685), French Dominican theologian
Louis Bancel (sculptor) (1926–1978), French sculptor
Stéphane Bancel (born 1972/1973), French billionaire businessman